Baron  was a general in the early Imperial Japanese Army.

Life and military career
Ōkubo was born to a samurai family; his father was descended from the Ōkubo clan, former daimyō of Odawara Domain, who served as hereditary Shinto priests at a shrine in Tōtōmi Province (in what is now Iwata, Shizuoka. Together with his father, he fought as a samurai in the Boshin War of the Meiji restoration.

After the Meiji Restoration, Ogawa attended a military boarding school in Osaka for the fledgling Imperial Japanese Army and was sent to France October 1870 for further training.  After his return in July 1875, he served in various staff posts within the Army Ministry. He was made a battalion commander of the IJA 14th Infantry Regiment under the Kumamoto Garrison in May 1880, returning to the Imperial Japanese Army General Staff in December 1882. He was given command of the IJA 12th Infantry Regiment in March 1886 and promoted to colonel in 1889. In June 1890, he became commandant of the Army’s Toyama Infantry School, and in June 1891 became commandant of the Imperial Japanese Army Academy.

In 1894, Ōkubo was promoted to major general, and given command of the IJA 7th Infantry Brigade, which saw extensive combat during the First Sino-Japanese War, especially at Hiacheng and Fengcheng in Manchuria. It also participated in the conquest of Taiwan. In December 1897, Ōkubo became commander of the 1st Guards Brigade.

In 1900, Ōkubo was promoted to lieutenant general and chief-of-staff of the Inspectorate General of Military Training. In May 1902, he became commander of the IJA 6th Infantry Division. During the Russo-Japanese War, the IJA 6th Infantry Division was attached to the Japanese Second Army, but after the Battle of Shaho was transferred to the Japanese Fourth Army before the Battle of Mukden. After the war, he was awarded with the Order of the Rising Sun, 1st class and the Order of the Golden Kite, 2nd class. In July 1906, he was transferred to command the IJA 3rd Division and in September 1907 was elevated to the kazoku peerage with the title of danshaku (baron). 

After his promotion to full general on 7 August 1908, Ōkubo became commander of the Chosen Army in Korea. He entered the reserves on 18 August 1911. After his death in January 1915, he was posthumously raised to 2nd Court Rank.

Decorations
 1887 –  Order of the Rising Sun, 4th class 
 1895 –  Order of the Sacred Treasure, 3rd class 
 1901 –  Order of the Rising Sun, 3rd class 
 1905 –  Grand Cordon of the Order of the Sacred Treasure 
 1906 –  Grand Cordon of the Order of the Rising Sun
 1906 –  Order of the Golden Kite, 2nd class
 1915 –  Order of the Rising Sun with Paulownia Flowers

Foreign Orders 

 Grand Cordon of the Order of the Plum Blossom in 1909

References

Footnotes

1846 births
1915 deaths
Japanese generals
Samurai
Kazoku
Japanese military personnel of the First Sino-Japanese War
Japanese military personnel of the Russo-Japanese War
Military personnel from Shizuoka Prefecture
People of Meiji-period Japan
Grand Cordons of the Order of the Rising Sun
Recipients of the Order of the Sacred Treasure, 1st class
Recipients of the Order of the Golden Kite, 2nd class
Recipients of the Order of the Rising Sun with Paulownia Flowers